Mitch Georgiades (born 28 September 2001) is an Australian rules footballer who plays for Port Adelaide in the Australian Football League (AFL).

Georgiades' father John played for Victorian Football League (VFL) club Footscray.

Georgiades made his AFL debut in Round 1 of the 2020 Season against Gold Coast, kicking two goals.

Georgiades, after a strong 3-goal outing against Melbourne in Round 9 of the 2020 Premiership Season, he was awarded an AFL Rising Star nomination.

He became one of the few individuals to be nominated for the rising star award twice.

References

External links

2001 births
Australian people of Greek descent
Living people
Port Adelaide Football Club players
Port Adelaide Football Club players (all competitions)
Australian rules footballers from Western Australia
Subiaco Football Club players
People educated at Hale School